Stratford Works was the locomotive-building works of the Great Eastern Railway situated at Stratford, London, England.  The original site of the works was located in the 'V' between the Great Eastern Main Line and the Stratford to Lea Bridge route and in the early years was also the home of Stratford Locomotive Depot. The final part of the works closed in 1991.

Overall Stratford works built 1,702 locomotives; 5,500 passenger vehicles and 33,000 goods wagons (although a significant number of these were built at the nearby Temple Mills wagon works when wagon building moved from the Stratford site in 1896).

History

Early history (1840-1862)

Activity on the site was started in 1840 by the Northern and Eastern Railway who had opened a new line that joined the Eastern Counties Railway at Stratford. The locomotives were maintained at a roundhouse called the Polygon which was built between July and September 1840 to a design by Robert Stephenson (a surviving example of which can be seen at Derby).

In 1847–1848 by the GER's predecessor, the Eastern Counties Railway moved onto the site as its own works at Romford had outgrown that site. Railway King George Hudson was behind this move and many of the original buildings were replaced at this time by new buildings. The area was known as Hudson Town for a number of years as the company built a number of houses in the area as well.

In 1850 1,000 men were employed at the works.

It was not until 1850 that the Eastern Counties Railway under Gooch built a locomotive at the then newly opened Stratford Works. Number 20 was the first of a class of six 2-2-2T locomotives (although three more were also built by R. B. Longridge and Company of Bedlington, Northumberland). Slightly bigger improved versions of the class followed in 1853 and 1854.

Fog signals which contained gunpowder were manufactured at the works with a special reinforced building being provided c. 1855. On 26 February 1857 this building exploded with three casualties. The subsequent inquiry was unable to uncover why the explosion had happened.

Locomotive superintendents 
From 1834 until his resignation in February 1843 resident engineer John Braithwaite responsibilities included locomotive matters, thereafter incumbents of Locomotive Superintendent of the Eastern Counties Railway were:
 1843–1845 William Fernihough 
 1845–1846 Thomas Scott 
 1846–1850 John Hunter
 1850–1856 John Viret Gooch
 1858–1862 Robert Sinclair

Great Eastern Railway era (1862-1922)

In 1862 the Great Eastern Railway took over the running of the works.

In the 1870s land was acquired to the north and west of  Stratford station and new locomotive sheds were built. This site was sometimes referred to as High Meads. However locomotives were still serviced on the original site until the 1880s. The carriage and wagon works expanded into new buildings alongside Angel Road and Leyton Road.

In 1875 a six-month period saw 66 engines repaired.

Between 1870 and 1900, some 960 locomotives were made at Stratford.

In 1891 the works set a new time record for building locomotives – a Class Y14 tender engine was built in 9 hours 47 minutes from the time the frames were stamped out to the completed and fully functional locomotive leaving the works. This record still stands.

However a need to find extra capacity for carriage painting led to some 200 carriages per year being repainted at a depot at Felixstowe Beach railway station.

Wagon building and maintenance moved to Temple Mills Wagon Works in 1896.

An order for two steam breakdown cranes was placed in 1902 and completed in 1908. It was unusual for a main line railway company to build its own cranes and most British companies bought their cranes from either Cowans (Carlisle), Ransome & Rapier (Ipswich) or Craven Brothers (Manchester). The latter of these lasted into British Rail days being allocated to Ipswich and after withdrawal was cut up at Saxmundham in 1967.

By 1912 some 6,500 people were employed at the works.
During 1912 39 new locomotives were built with 10 others being converted (upgraded?). The new builds included the first five S69 (“1500”) (LNER B12) class 4-6-0 as well as Y14 (LNER J15), E72 (LNER J18) 0-6-0  and G69 (LNER F6) 2-4-2T locomotives. A total of 82 new carriages were built in 1912 with 51 main line and 31 suburban carriages being built. Additionally a total of 75 non-passenger  vehicles were also constructed including horse boxes, six wheel carriage vans and an elephant van! How many elephants were carried by the latter vehicle is sadly not known.

During World War I the works undertook war work including munitions manufacture and building a hospital train for the army. At the beginning of the war the superintendent for the works identified that the works was already pressed to meet the requirements of the Great Eastern Railway and requested the building of a new locomotive repair facility. With a predicted up-turn in rail traffic likely, this request clearly resonated with the authorities and the Engine Repair Shed, situated on the far western side of Stratford TMD, was opened in 1915.

In addition to its usual load the works overhauled eight Caledonian Railway 0-6-0 locomotives.

One of the more unusual tasks the works undertook in the war was the construction of henhouses for the GER farm at Bentley, Suffolk. each of which had a works number.

Late in the war during 1918 Stratford Works repaired two Belgian locomotives. These had been evacuated to France in 1914 when the Germans invaded the country (a total of 250 engines were in fact evacuated) and had been used in France by the Railway Operating Division. They were both 0-6-0 locomotives.

In a six-month period in 1920 the works undertook 216 heavy locomotive repairs, 40 rebuilds and 11 new locomotives were built.

Facilities at grouping (1921)
In 1921 the offices were located in front of the main works. As well as housing administrative and managerial staff there were draughtsmen working under the Chief Mechanical Engineer. These were destroyed by an incendiary bomb in World War II.

The Great Eastern Railway produced a number of booklets about the works; the 1921 issue was reproduced in 1991 to mark the closure of the works. This booklet also covered the wagon works at Temple Mills. The table below lists the workshops (described here as shops) and departments of the works in 1921.

There were two separate carriage works . These were known as CD1 and CD2. CD1 was to the north of the original site whilst CD2 was on the High Meads site linked together by a tunnel under the Lea Bridge line. CD1 was expanded in the late 1840s and again in the early 1860s.

Carriage works CD1

Carriage works CD2

Other railway departments in the Stratford area (1921)
 Drawing Office - there were two separate offices until 1930. One dealt with rolling stock the other with plant, buildings etc.
 Signalling and Permanent Way (Leyton)
 Printing shop (adjacent Stratford Market station)
 Lamp repairs
 Building Department
 Mechanics Institute  
 Electric Light and Power (near CD2)
 Millwrights (near CD2)

There was a goods yard east of Stratford station called Angel Lane.

Power
The Great Eastern had a generating station that served the works and depot with sub-stations at the engine repair shop, Temple Mills wagon works and various sub stations on the original site. The supply was three-phase 50 Hz alternating current which was supplied at 6,000 volts before being transformed down to 440 volts.

There was also an oil gas works on site near CD2. Whilst the Great Eastern was fitting electric lighting to most of its carriages, it still had 4,000 lit by The gas works was established in 1877 using the Pintsch principle system and initially capable of supplying gas for 200 carriages. Whilst the principal gassing point was at Stratford suburban outposts such as Wood Street, Enfield and Alexandra Palace all had equipment to allow carriages to be supplied by gas. The gas itself was moved in tank wagons from the plant at Stratford and then attached to distribution pipes at those locations. In 1880 the use of gas was extended to the Loughton line which resulted in an expansion of the plant and again in 1883 when the Blackwall and North Woolwich line carriages were converted. 
The GER was keen to convert main line stock and during 1890/1891 the gas works was further extended with Parkeston Quay becoming the first location outside the suburban area to have gassing facilities.
Between 1892 and 1912 a fleet of 41 four wheel gas tank wagons were built for distributing gas to outlying stations. Gas mains were laid to Ilford and Tottenham in 1900.
Gas continued to light suburban and branch line carriages and be used in kitchen and restaurant cars until the 1950s with the plant closing in 1960.

Locomotive superintendents 
The locomotive superintendents of the Great Eastern Railway were:
 1862–1866 Robert Sinclair
 1866–1873 Samuel W. Johnson
 1873–1878 William Adams
 1878–1881 Massey Bromley
 1881–1885 Thomas William Worsdell
 1885–1907 James Holden
 1908–1912 S. D. Holden
 1912–1922 Alfred John Hill – Chief Mechanical Engineer from 1915

The Works Manager between 1881 and 1898 was George Macallan (15 December 1837 -28 May 1913) who had first been employed by the Eastern Counties Railway in 1854 and with the exception of a six-year posting in Cambridge had worked in a succession of posts at Stratford. He invented the Macallan blastpipe with an associate Charles Adams, which was patented in 1888 and fitted to around 700 GER locomotives. Other railways also fitted the device included the Great Northern Railway, Great North of Scotland Railway and the Furness Railway.

London and North Eastern Railway era (1923-1948)

At the grouping in 1923, the works passed to the London and North Eastern Railway.  Locomotive-building ceased soon afterwards but the works continued to do repairs and maintenance. The last locomotives built on the site were N7 0-6-2T engines. Construction of carriages to GER designs ceased in 1923 with the completion of a batch of coaches for Ilford services, and all carriage construction ceased after 1927 although repairs of carriages used on the Great Eastern section of the LNER continued and new equipment dedicated to this was installed progressively between 1927 and 1931.

During World War II artillery parts and aircraft components were manufactured by the works. These included parts for tanks, landing craft, coastal defence guns, 2-pounder guns, Hotchkiss Machine Guns, forgings for mortar bomb, valves for oil tankers and parts for road vehicles.

The works was hit several times during the London Blitz and by a V2 rocket later in the war.

During the Second World War eight US Army Class S160 2-8-0s were accepted into service on the works (couplings fitted, motion attached, wheels reprofiled) during 1943. Other members of the class were accepted at other works throughout the UK. The locomotives were employed on freight trains in the run up to the invasion of Europe during 1943 and 1944.

In 1947, 2,032 men were employed in the works.

British Railways era (1948-1991)
The works passed to British Railways in 1948.

The Polygon which up until stage was thought to be used as a wheel fitting shop was closed and demolished in 1949.

The original site ceased operation in 1963 whilst the 1915 shed became a Diesel locomotive repair shop, about the same time, as British Railways had learned lessons with regard to maintaining diesel locomotives in steam sheds. In the 1980s many older diesel classes were 'cannibalised' (stripped for spares) at the works to keep other locomotives operational. The diesel repair shop finally closed on 31 March 1991 and the preserved L77 (LNER N7) 0-6-2T, the last locomotive built at Stratford, was on site during the final week of operation along with a Class 40 diesel (which worked on the Great Eastern Main line in the late 1950s and early 1960s).

In the 1970s, part of the site became the Stratford London International Freight Terminal with a number of large warehouses some of which were rail connected. There was also a Freightliner terminal on the west side of the Channelsea Loop Line.

In the 1990s, the site was earmarked for the new Stratford International station and the Westfield Stratford City shopping centre which opened in 2011.

Works locomotives

Stratford Works had a small fleet of engines that undertook shunting and lifting duties at the works. These included:

Notes

References

Citations

Sources

Further reading

External links 

 The Great Eastern Railway Society

Railway workshops in Great Britain
Great Eastern Railway
Former buildings and structures in the London Borough of Newham
History of rail transport in London
Transport in the London Borough of Newham
Railway depots in London
Stratford, London